Catherine Bateson (born 1960 in Sydney) is an Australian writer.

Career 
Born in Sydney in 1960, Bateson grew up in a second-hand bookshop in Brisbane. She attained a Bachelor of Arts from the University of Queensland, with a major in art history.
 
Her first published novel was Painted Love Letters, a portrait of a family coping with death. She has published two volumes of poetry, and three verse novels for young adults using a variety of poetic forms including haiku, free verse, free renga and acrostic.

Bateson has taught creative writing for the past thirteen years, and has been a guest writer at many schools. Her work has been read on radio and featured on television. She has also appeared at various poetry and writers festivals throughout Australia. She coordinated La Mama Poetica at La Mama Theatre in Melbourne.

Bateson is the mother of two children, Alasdair, born in 1991 and Helen, born 1992.

She currently teaches creative writing at GippsTafe, Victoria and lives in the Dandenong Ranges, Victoria.

Bibliography 
 Pomegranates from the Underworld (1990)
 The Vigilant Heart (1998)
 A Dangerous Girl (2000) ( Catherine's 1st published novel )
 The Year It All Happened (2001)
 Painted Love Letters (2002)
 Rain May and Captain Daniel (2002)
 The Airdancer of Glass (2004)
 Millie and the Night Heron (2005)
 His Name in Fire (2006)
 Being Bee (2006)
 The Wish Pony, Woolshed Press (2008)
 Magenta McPhee, Woolshed Press (2009)
Marriage for Beginners: And other poems, John Leonard Press (2009)
Mimi and the Blue Slave, Woolshed Press (2010)
Hanging Out, Omnibus Books (2010)
Star, Omnibus Books (2012)
Lisette's Paris Notebook, Allen & Unwin (2017)

Awards and nominations
 "This is the Poem"
 John Shaw Neilson Award for poetry.
 2006 Faw Mary Grant Bruce Short Story Award For Children's Literature

 2003 – Rain May and Captain Daniel
 winner of the Children's Book Council of Australia Book of the Year Award, younger readers
 shortlisted for New South Wales Premier's Literary Awards, Patricia Wrighton Prize for Children's Literature
 Queensland Premier's Literary Awards, Children's Book Award

 2003 – Painted Love Letters
 CBCA Honour Book recognition
 winner 2003 Australian Family Therapists' Award for Children's Literature
 2003 shortlisted for the New South Wales Premier's Literary Awards, Ethel Turner Prize for young people's literature
 Children's Book Council of Australia Awards (2003) Honour Book, older readers.

 2005 – Millie and the Night Heron
Honour Book, CBCA Book of the Year, Younger Readers
 2007 – His Name in Fire
 Notable CBCA Book of the Year, Older Readers
 Shortlist, Queensland Premier's Award
 2007 – Being Bee
 Winner CBCA Book of the Year, Younger Readers
 2009 – The Wish Pony, Woolshed Press
 CBCA Honour Book, Younger Readers

References

External links 
 Catherine Bateson Website
 Personal blog
 Writing blog
 University of Queensland Press

1960 births
Living people
Australian children's writers
Australian women novelists
Australian women poets
University of Queensland alumni
20th-century Australian novelists
Australian women children's writers
Writers from Brisbane
20th-century Australian women writers